Fear of a Wack Planet is an album by the trip hop/rap rock band Phunk Junkeez, released in 1998. The album's title references the 1990 Public Enemy album Fear of a Black Planet. It was the band's third album.

Critical reception
Phoenix New Times concluded that "there's certainly a demographic for white-boy funk and rap, but Wack Planet does little to evolve the genre, and will surely be filed inconspicuously among the 311 and Sublime selections of teenagers with pierced lips everywhere." The Washington Post wrote: "Ranging from the loungey 'Down Town' to the raucous 'Million Rappers', the Junkees provide a credible hip-hopped update of the funk-punk sound trailblazed 15 years ago by the Red Hot Chili Peppers." The San Diego Union-Tribune noted: "Weaving pointed social commentary with the seductive rhythms of funk and hip-hop, the Arizona-based group has plenty to say."

Track listing

References

1998 albums
Phunk Junkeez albums